Coast Guard Motor Lifeboat CG-36500 is a historic, 36-foot lifeboat that is berthed at Rock Harbor in Orleans, Massachusetts. Built in 1946, it is notable for its involvement in the 1952 SS Pendleton rescue, one of the most daring such events recorded in the history of the United States Coast Guard. It was listed on the National Register of Historic Places in 2005, and now serves as a museum boat.

Description
CG-36500 is a standard 36-foot lifeboat, a vessel specifically designed to remain operational under extremely difficult conditions. It has a heavy  bronze keel and skeg, watertight compartments, and self-bailing features. It is sheathed with Monel plating, which allows for winter time ice breaking.

History
The boat was built in 1946 at the Curtis Bay Maryland Coast Guard Yard, where all 36-footers were built.  On 18 February 1952, the crew of CG-36500, which consisted of Boatswain's Mate First Class Bernard C. Webber (coxswain), Engineman Third Class Andrew Fitzgerald, Seaman Ervin Maske, and Seaman Richard P. Livesey, rescued 32 of 33 crewmen trapped on the stern section of the tanker , which had broken in half in a storm off Chatham, Massachusetts. (The ship's eight other crew members, including Captain John Fitzgerald, were on the bow section when it broke off and sank.)  The rescue of the survivors of the shipwrecked Pendleton is considered one of the most daring rescues of the United States Coast Guard.  The story is told in the 2016 motion picture The Finest Hours, based on the 2009 book by the same title.

The boat was taken out of service in 1968, and was given to the National Park Service for use as an exhibit at Cape Cod National Seashore.  In November 1981, the Park Service, which had not effected any significant restoration work on the vessel, deeded it to the Orleans Historical Society, and a restoration started by a group of volunteers from Chatham, Orleans, and Harwich, Massachusetts. Restoration work was completed in six months and the boat was re-launched in a public ceremony that was attended by Bernard Webber and his wife.
It is currently powered with a Detroit Diesel 4-71 built in 1948, with about 95 horsepower. During the rescue, it was powered with a 6 cylinder Sterling Petrel gas engine, made in Buffalo, New York. The carbureted engine was problematic during the rescue.

External Links 
CG-36500 Gold Medal Boat

See also 
National Register of Historic Places listings in Barnstable County, Massachusetts

Notes

Citations

References used

  

Ships of the United States Coast Guard
Ships on the National Register of Historic Places in Massachusetts
Buildings and structures in Barnstable County, Massachusetts
Orleans, Massachusetts
National Register of Historic Places in Barnstable County, Massachusetts
Museum ships in Massachusetts
1946 ships
Ships built in Maryland
Maritime incidents in 1952
Motor lifeboats of the United States